Evan Flatow, M.D. (born March 21, 1956) is an American orthopaedic surgeon-scientist. As of 2023, he is President of Mount Sinai West (formerly Mount Sinai Roosevelt), part of the Mount Sinai Health System. He published more than 400 book chapters and peer-reviewed articles. Flatow is indicated as principal or co-principal investigator for nine research grants and listed on six patents for influential shoulder implant systems.

Before Flatow's appointment at Mount Sinai West, he served as the Bernard J. Lasker Professor and Chair of the Leni and Peter W. May Department of Orthopaedic Surgery at Icahn School of Medicine at Mount Sinai, where he established a basic science tendon research group in the Orthopaedic Research Laboratory, and he also served as Director of the Orthopaedic Surgery Service at Mount Sinai Hospital in New York City. He was chosen by Castle Connolly as one of America's top doctors and has won the American Shoulder and Elbow Surgeons' Neer Award, its highest honor, four times. He is the President of the Board of Trustees of St. Hilda's & St. Hugh's, where he graduated in 1973.

Career
Flatow graduated from Princeton University with an A.B. in biomedical sciences in 1977 after completing a 39-page long senior thesis titled "The Comparative Biochemistry of Microtubule Accessory Proteins." He earned his medical degree from the Columbia University College of Physicians and Surgeons in 1981 and completed a surgical residency at St. Luke's-Roosevelt Hospital Center and an orthopaedic residency and fellowship at Columbia-Presbyterian Medical Center.

In 1998, after 11 years on the faculty at Columbia University, Flatow joined the staff at Mount Sinai Hospital. He was Chair of Orthopaedics from 2005 until 2014, and then President of Mount Sinai West, a position he still holds as of 2023. In collaboration with Mount Sinai's Department of Anesthesiology, Flatow pioneered the use of regional blocks to diminish the need for general anesthesia in shoulder surgery.

He held positions as Chair of the Trustees of the Journal of Shoulder and Elbow Surgery, and Chair of the Publications Committee and of the Council on Education of the American Academy of Orthopaedic Surgeons. He also served as President of American Shoulder & Elbow Surgeons.

Scientific contributions

Grants 
As of 2023, Flatow was Principal Investigator (PI) or Co-Principal on 11 research grants. Partial list:

 Orthopaedic Research and Education Foundation PI, Career Development Award, April, 1989, $100,000 over 2 years. Biomechanical investigations into shoulder joint surface anatomy and modes of articulation.
 PI, National Institutes of Health/NIAMSD K-08 Clinician Investigator Award, April, 1994, Pathobiology of rotator cuff tendon injury.
 PI, Orthopaedic Research and Education Society, Prospective Clinical Research Grant, February, 1996. Surgical repair of the torn rotator cuff tendon: a prospective analysis of function, quality of life, costs and factors that affect these analyses.
 PI, Aircast Foundation, Research Grant, December, 2001. Assessment of Damage Accumulation in Rat Tendons.
 PI, National Institutes of Health/NIAMSD R01 “Tendon response to In Vivo Fatigue Damage”.
 PI, August 2011 –June 2014, Co-Investigator June 2014 –July 2016, National Institutes of Health/NIAMSD R01 “Effect of tendon damage accumulation on healing and adaptation.”
 Co-PI, National Institutes of Health/National Institute of Aging R01 August 2012 – April 2017 “Human stem cell progenitor cell aging and regeneration.”
 Co-PI, National Institutes of Health/NIAMSD R13 2014 “New Frontiers in Tendon Research.”
 Co-PI, New York City Economic Development Corporation Grant to build a Comprehensive Center for Surgical Innovation, Awarded November 2022, $11.6M over 2 years.

Patents 
Flatow co-developed humeral stem and glenoid socket designs and procedures for coated and uncoated shoulder replacements. The process requires minimal bone resection and as of 2023 is used globally in total shoulder arthroplasty. Patents include: 
Orthopaedic implant having an articulating surface with a conforming and translational surface, (1997).
Orthopaedic implant having an articulating surface with a conforming and translational surface, (1999).
Clamp assembly for use with orthopaedic retractor frame assembly, (2000).
Instrument for seating a prosthesis, (2000).
Method and instruments for positioning humeral component during shoulder arthroplasty, (2010).
Intervention for tendinopathy, (2020).

Developments and implications 
Flatow focuses on minimally invasive fracture repair, arthroscopic rotator cuff surgery, arthroscopic repair and shoulder replacement. Developments include: 

Shoulder articular geometry and kinematics: Flatow contributed to the development of a glenoid implant with dual-curvatures allowing central conformity with low contact stress.

Cadaver studies of rotator cuff tendon injury: demonstrated the effects of subacromial compression and tensile load on the supraspinatus tendon, with implications for clinical failure.

Clinical outcome studies of rotator cuff tendon repair: rotator cuff tendon failure and repair, demonstration that cuff-tendon repair was a cost-effective procedure, that re-tears were common, and that muscle atrophy did not recover after tendon repair.

Development of a rat infrapatellar tendon repetitive fatigue-damage model of tendon injury: collaborated  to refine histologic and imaging techniques to assess tendon damage.

Characterization of the mechanical and biologic response of tendon to repetitive fatigue damage, and the effect of exercise.Demonstrated that damage is permanent, apoptosis resulted, and fatigued tendon failed to mount a robust biologic and reparative response.

Honors and awards
Manfred Pyka Physics Prize, Princeton University, Princeton, New Jersey, June, 1974
Phi Beta Kappa, Princeton University, Princeton, New Jersey, June, 1977
Alumni Association Bronze Medal, College of Physicians and Surgeons Alumni Association, Columbia University, June, 1981
The Frank E. Stinchfield Award for Excellence in Orthopaedic Surgery, New York, 1985, 1986
Orthopaedic Hospital at Columbia-Presbyterian Medical Center, New York, New York, April, 1986
Career Development Award, Orthopaedic Research and Education Foundation, April, 1989
The Neer Award for Excellence in Shoulder Research, American Shoulder and Elbow Surgeons, 1992, 1994, 1996, 2004
Irving Scholar Award, College of Physicians and Surgeons, Columbia University, March, 1993
European Traveling Fellowship, American Shoulder and Elbow Surgeons, May, 1993
Clinician Investigator Award, National Institutes of Health/NIAMSD, April, 1994
American, British, Canadian Exchange Traveling Fellowship, American Orthopaedic Association, May, 1995
Lifetime Achievement Award, New York Chapter, Arthritis Foundation, 2009
Elected to College of Fellows, American Institute for Medical and Biological Engineering, 2010
Jacobi Medallion, Association of the Alumni of The Mount Sinai Hospital, 2021

Publications 
Flatow is a reviewer for Clinical Orthopaedics and Related Research, the Journal of Bone and Joint Surgery, Arthroscopy, the Journal of Orthopaedic Research, and the American Journal of Sports Medicine. He is the former North American editor and chair, board of trustees, for the Journal of Shoulder and Elbow Surgery. He is a reviewer for that journal as of 2022.

Books 
Shoulder Arthroplasty. Louis U. Bigliani, Evan L. Flatow (editors). Springer, 2005. 
The Rotator Cuff. Part I. The Orthopedic Clinics of North America. Evan L. Flatow (author). Saunders, 1997. ASIN B0019FV1QW
The Rotator Cuff. Part II. The Orthopedic Clinics of North America. Evan L. Flatow (author). Saunders, 1997. ASIN B0018OPBX8
Humerus (Musculoskeletal Trauma Series). Evan L. Flatow, Christoph Ulrich (authors); Evan L. Flatow (editor). Butterworth-Heinemann, 1997. 
The Unstable Shoulder. Louis U. Bigliani, Robert A. Arciero, Evan L. Flatow, Roger G. Pollock, James E. Tibone, Jon J. P. Warner (editors). Amer Acad of Orthopaedic Surgeons, 1996. 
Complex and Revision Problems in Shoulder Surgery. Jon JP Warner, Joseph P Iannotti, Evan L Flatow (editors). Lippincott Williams & Wilkins, 2005. 
Atlas of Essential Orthopaedic Procedures, Second Edition, Evan L. Flatow, Alexis C. Colvin, Wolters Kluwer Health, 2019.

Peer reviewed publications 
As of 2023, Flatow was cited 22,600 times, has an h-index of 81and an i10-index of 194.

Highest cited (partial list): 

 Gladstone JN, Bishop JY, Lo IKY, Flatow EL. Fatty Infiltration and Atrophy of the Rotator Cuff do not Improve after Rotator Cuff Repair and Correlate with Poor Functional Outcome. The American Journal of Sports Medicine. 2007;35(5):719-728. doi:10.1177/0363546506297539 Citations: 930
 Bigliani LU, Pollock RG, Soslowsky LJ, Flatow EL, Pawluk RJ, Mow VC. Tensile properties of the inferior glenohumeral ligament. J Orthop Res. 1992 Mar;10(2):187-97. doi: 10.1002/jor.1100100205. . Citations: 735
 Bishop J, Klepps S, Lo IK, Bird J, Gladstone JN, Flatow EL. Cuff integrity after arthroscopic versus open rotator cuff repair: a prospective study. J Shoulder Elbow Surg. 2006 May-Jun;15(3):290-9. doi: 10.1016/j.jse.2005.09.017. . Citations: 668
 Bigliani LU, Ticker JB, Flatow EL, Soslowsky LJ, Mow VC. The relationship of acromial architecture to rotator cuff disease. Clinics in Sports Medicine. 1991 Oct;10(4):823-838. . Citations: 619
 Flatow EL, Soslowsky LJ, Ticker JB, et al. Excursion of the Rotator Cuff Under the Acromion: Patterns of Subacromial Contact. The American Journal of Sports Medicine. 1994;22(6):779-788. doi:10.1177/036354659402200609 Citations: 481
Most recent: 

 Duey, Akiro & Li, Troy & White, Christopher & Patel, Akshar & Cirino, Carl & Parsons, Bradford & Flatow, Evan & Cagle, Paul. (2023). A comparison of pegged and keeled glenoid clinical outcomes at long-term follow-up after total shoulder arthroplasty. Journal of Orthopaedics. 36. 10.1016/j.jor.2023.01.006. 
 White, Christopher & Patel, Akshar & Wang, Kevin & Cirino, Carl & Parsons, Bradford & Flatow, Evan & Cagle, Paul. (2023). The impact of tobacco use on clinical outcomes and long-term survivorship after anatomic total shoulder arthroplasty. Journal of Orthopaedics. 36. 10.1016/j.jor.2023.01.002. 
 White, Christopher & Duey, Akiro & Parsons, Bradford & Flatow, Evan & Cagle, Paul. (2023). Anatomic Total Shoulder Arthroplasty Outcomes and Implant Survivability at Greater Than 22 Years Postoperative Follow-up: A Case Series. Journal of Orthopaedic Reports. 2. 100129. 10.1016/j.jorep.2022.100129. 
 White, Christopher & Patel, Akshar & Cirino, Carl & Wang, Kevin & Gross, Benjamin & Parsons, Bradford & Flatow, Evan & Cagle, Paul. (2022). Does Body Mass Index Influence Long-Term Outcomes After Anatomic Total Shoulder Arthroplasty?. Journal of Shoulder and Elbow Surgery. 10.1016/j.jse.2022.10.032. 
 Wang, Kevin & Kantrowitz, David & Patel, Akshar & Parsons, Bradford & Flatow, Evan & Cagle, Paul. (2022). Survivorship of Total Shoulder Arthroplasty versus Hemiarthroplasty for the Treatment of Avascular Necrosis at Greater than 10-Year Follow-up. Journal of shoulder and elbow surgery. 31. 10.1016/j.jse.2022.02.019.

References

External links
The Mount Sinai Hospital
Icahn School of Medicine at Mount Sinai

1956 births
Columbia University Vagelos College of Physicians and Surgeons alumni
Living people
Icahn School of Medicine at Mount Sinai faculty
American orthopedic surgeons
Princeton University alumni